Happy Birthday Baby was a hit for Tony Christie in 1974. It was also a hit for Lee Towers in 1980.

Tony Christie version

The song was written by Barry Mason and  Roger Greenaway. It was released in the UK on MCA MCA 157 in September 1974. The B side was "Who Am I Fooling".  By December 21, 1974, Billboard Magazine had recorded the single at no. 10 in the New Zealand Top 10.
It peaked at no. 7, and spent a total of seven weeks in the charts.

Charts

Weekly charts

Year-end charts

Lee Towers version

Towers's version peaked at no 38 in the Netherlands in 1980, and spent five weeks in the charts.

References

1974 singles
1979 singles
1974 songs
Songs written by Barry Mason
Songs written by Roger Greenaway
MCA Records singles
Tony Christie songs
Song recordings produced by Peter Sullivan (record producer)